Jack Martin may refer to:

In sports
Jack Martin (Australian footballer) (born 1995), Australian rules footballer for Carlton
Jack Martin (basketball) (1922–2015), American college basketball coach
Jack Martin (baseball) (1887–1980), Major League Baseball player in the 1910s
Jack Martin (footballer, born 1882) (1882–?), English footballer for Lincoln City, Blackburn Rovers, Hartlepools United in the 1900s/1910s
Jack Martin (footballer, born 1935) (1935–), Scottish footballer, Full Back for Sheffield Wednesday and Rochdale
Jack Martin (cricketer) (1917–1987), English Test cricketer
Jack Martin (drag racer), American drag racing driver; see Jim Warren
Jack Martin (footballer, born 1903) (1903–1976), English football centre half for many teams in north-west England in the 1920s/1930s
Jack Martin (footballer, born 1904) (1904–1984), English football outside left for Darlington, Leeds, Accrington Stanley, Bury, Doncaster in the 1920s/1930s
Jack Martin (ice hockey) (born 1940), former ice hockey player in the National Hockey League
Jack Martin (American football) (1922–2008), American football player

Other
Jack Martin (investigator), New Orleans resident who claimed to have information about a conspiracy to assassinate President John F. Kennedy
Jack Martin (executive), chairman and chief executive officer of Hill+Knowlton Strategies
Jack Martin (actor), Australian actor
Jack Martin, protagonist of The Adventures of Smilin' Jack
Jack Martin, American actor

See also
John Martin (disambiguation)